Stormy Lake may refer to:
 Stormy Lake (Alaska), a lake on the Kenai Peninsula in Alaska, U.S.
 Stormy Lake (Ontario) or Patterson Lake, a lake in Parry Sound District, Ontario, Canada
 Stormy Lake (Haliburton County, Ontario), a lake in Haliburton County, Ontario, Canada
 Stormy Lake, a lake near Conover, Wisconsin, U.S.